The Department of Tourism is a West Bengal government department. It is an interior ministry mainly responsible for the administration of the development of Tourism in West Bengal.

List of Ministers
 Krishnendu Narayan Choudhury
Bratya Basu
 Goutam Deb
 Indranil Sen MOS (Independent Charge)

Introduction

The Department of Tourism, Government of West Bengal, is responsible for the development of tourism in the state of West Bengal. The Department of Tourism in West Bengal is engaged in facilitating the services for promotion of tourism.

Facilities
The Department has a unit named West Bengal Tourism Development Corporation which has many tourist centers all around the state at various districts where online booking is also available. The Department has taken a number of initiatives and also offers various packages through WBTDCL throughout the year as well as on specials occasions and festivals like Durga Puja, the greatest festival of the world, Christmas, Poush Mela, Basanta Utsav etc. The Department has its digital presence through its website, Mobile App and Social Media, Radio and TV as well as audio visual mediums.

References

Government departments of West Bengal
Tourism in West Bengal
West Bengal